The Lone Star Army Ammunition Plant was a  government-owned, contractor-operated (GOCO) facility 12 miles west of Texarkana, Texas that was established in 1942.  The land was purchased from local citizens through Eminent Domain by the United States Department of Defense.  The Lone Star Defense Corporation, a subsidiary of the B. F. Goodrich Rubber Corporation, won the contract on July 23, 1941 to produce artillery shells, bombs, fuses, boosters, and other auxiliary munitions at the site.  The plant produced ammunition throughout World War II, the Korean War and the Vietnam War.  The plant was last operated by Day & Zimmermann.

Today
The Lone Star Army Ammunition Plant was officially deactivated September 30, 2009, after serving its mission of providing ammunition for almost 70 years. Future plans include directing the I-69 Corridor through the facility once the property has been transferred from the local community.

Environment

The Lone Star Army Ammunition Plant was listed as a Superfund site on the National Priorities List on July 22, 1987.  The United States Environmental Protection Agency listed the primary contaminants of concern as tetryl, mercury, chromium, and lead.  Cleanup activities began on June 29, 2001 and continued until September 24, 2002.  The site should be deleted from the National Priorities List in 2010.

References

External links
GlobalSecurity.org - Lone Star Army Ammunition Plant

United States Army arsenals
Buildings and structures in Bowie County, Texas
Historic American Engineering Record in Texas
Military facilities in Texas
Military Superfund sites
United States Army arsenals during World War II
Superfund sites in Texas
1942 establishments in Texas
2009 disestablishments in Texas